Iwata (written:  lit. "rock ricefield") is a Japanese surname. Notable people with the surname include:

, Japanese golfer
Karen Iwata (born 1998), Japanese singer
Kiyomi Iwata (born 1941), Japanese-American artist
Manzo Iwata (1924–1993), Japanese martial artist
Masaharu Iwata (born 1966), Japanese video game composer
Masahiro Iwata (born 1981), Japanese football player
Minoru Iwata (born 1983), Japanese baseball pitcher
Mitsuo Iwata (born 1967), Japanese voice actor
Nakayama Iwata (1895-1949), Japanese photographer
Satoru Iwata (1959–2015), Japanese businessman
Sayuri Iwata (born 1990), Japanese actress and J-Pop artist
Shinji Iwata (born 1987), Japanese baseball pitcher
Takuya Iwata (footballer, born 1983), Japanese footballer
Takuya Iwata (footballer, born 1994), Japanese footballer
, Japanese jockey
Yasuo Iwata (1942–2009), Japanese voice actor
, Japanese film director and illustrator

Japanese-language surnames